Palette is the debut mini-album of Japanese voice actor and J-Pop singer, Nobuhiko Okamoto. It was released in Japan on 23 May 2012 on Kiramune.

Summary 
Two types of release Edition luxury and board, DVD was recorded making and PV of future sketch is included in the former. In addition, message card is enclosed as Limited benefits of various.

According to Okamoto, the title "Palette" refers to the intention of wanting to enjoy the different shades of all six songs.

The album was charted 9th on the Oricon and was sold over 0.6 million copies.

Song information 
 "Positive Fighter" - Because of the up-tempo, while recording, the songs note also has a different pitch in the outside.
 "" - Okamoto's Adult contemporary medium ballad.

Track listing

 DVD (only First Press Limited Edition)
 未来スケッチ -Music Video-
 making of 未来スケッチ
 TRAILER

Charts

References

External links
 豪華盤
 通常盤

2012 EPs